Naa Oopiri is a 2005 Telugu language film directed by Kanmani and starring Vadde Naveen, Sangeetha, and Anjana in the lead roles. Kanmani originally wanted to make the film in Tamil. This film marks the Telugu debut of Anjana, Kanmani, Deepak Dev (in his only Telugu album to date), and Suresh Urs.

Cast 

 Vadde Naveen as Venu
 Sangeetha as Gowri
 Anjana as Madhu (credited as Juhi)
 Sudha
 M. S. Narayana as Prasad
 Surya
 Gundu Hanumantha Rao
 Lalitha Raj
 Baby Abhinaya
 Master Viswanath

Production 
The muhurat for the film took place in 2004 at Annapoorna Studios. The film is directed by Kanmani, who has worked as an assistant director for Tamil films for 12 years, notably for Gemini. The cinematographer, Krishna, previously worked as an assistant to Santosh Sivan.

Soundtrack 
The music was composed by Deepak Dev and lyrics were written by Bhuvana Chandra, Suddala Ashok Teja & Sriharsha.

Awards 
Nandi Awards
 Special Jury Award for Best Performance - Vadde Naveen

Release
The film received mixed to positive reviews upon release. Full Hyderabad gave the film 6 out of 10 stars stating "Naveen deserves kudos for his brave effort to crawl back into mainstream cinema, but he simply isn't up to this one".
 Idlebrain stated that "Naa Oopiri, by a long stretch, is the best film that Vadde Naveen has acted so far. The story and its treatment is indeed refreshing". Idlebrain praised the first half of the film as well as Naveen's performance stating that "This is the most challenging character for Naveen in his entire career".

References

2005 films
2000s Telugu-language films